The 2019–20 Syracuse Orange women's basketball team represented Syracuse University during the 2019–20 NCAA Division I women's basketball season. The Orange were led by thirteenth year head coach Quentin Hillsman. The Orange were seventh year members of the Atlantic Coast Conference and played their home games at the Carrier Dome.

The Orange finished the season 16–15 and 9–9 in ACC play to finish in eighth place.  As the eighth seed in the ACC tournament, they defeated Virginia in the Second Round before losing to Louisville in Quarterfinals.  The NCAA tournament and WNIT were cancelled due to the COVID-19 outbreak.

Previous season
For the 2018–19 season, the Orange finished 11–5 in ACC play and 25–9 overall. Their record achieved fifth place in the ACC. Syracuse was eliminated in the semifinals of the ACC women's tournament by Notre Dame. They received an at-large bid to the NCAA women's tournament, receiving a three seed in the Portland regional, where they defeated Fordham in the first round before being upset by South Dakota State in the second round.

Off-season

Recruiting Class

Source:

Roster

Schedule

Source:

|-
!colspan=9 style="background:#D44500; color:#212B6D;"|Non-conference regular season

|-
!colspan=9 style="background:#D44500; color:#212B6D;"| ACC regular season

|-
!colspan=9 style="background:#D44500; color:#212B6D;"| ACC Women's Tournament

Rankings

The Coaches Poll releases a final poll after the NCAA tournament, but the AP Poll does not release a poll at this time.

See also
 2019–20 Syracuse Orange men's basketball team

References

Syracuse Orange women's basketball seasons
Syracuse
Syracuse basketball, women
Syracuse basketball, women